Kovan Abdulraheem (born 1 March 1988 in Duhok) is an Iraqi Paralympic athlete of short stature and he competes in F41-classification throwing events.

Career 

He represented Iraq at the 2012 Summer Paralympics and at the 2016 Summer Paralympics. In 2016, he won the gold medal in the men's javelin throw F41 event with a distance of 42.85m. In 2019, he qualified to represent Iraq at the 2020 Summer Paralympics after winning the bronze medal in the men's javelin throw F41 event at the 2019 World Championships held in Dubai, United Arab Emirates.

At the 2015 World Championships held in Doha, Qatar, he won the silver medal in the men's javelin throw F41 event.

Achievements

References

External links 
 
 

Living people
1988 births
People from Duhok
Iraqi male javelin throwers
Paralympic athletes of Iraq
Paralympic gold medalists for Iraq
Paralympic medalists in athletics (track and field)
Athletes (track and field) at the 2012 Summer Paralympics
Athletes (track and field) at the 2016 Summer Paralympics
Athletes (track and field) at the 2020 Summer Paralympics
Medalists at the 2016 Summer Paralympics
Competitors in athletics with dwarfism
Medalists at the World Para Athletics Championships
Medalists at the 2010 Asian Para Games
Medalists at the 2014 Asian Para Games
Medalists at the 2018 Asian Para Games
Paralympic javelin throwers
21st-century Iraqi people